The Men's 3000 metres event  at the 2011 European Athletics Indoor Championships was held on March 4 and 5 with the final being held on March 5 at 16:50 local time.

Records

Results

Heats
First 3 in each heat and 3 best performers advance to the Final. The heats were held at 11:15.

Heat 1 

Note: Yegor Nikolayev qualified to the final by judge decision as during his race he collided with another athlete competing in different event.

Final 
The final was held at 16:50.

References 

3000 metres at the European Athletics Indoor Championships
2011 European Athletics Indoor Championships